Pearson plc is a British multinational publishing and education company headquartered in London, England. 

It was originally founded as a construction business in the 1840s but switched to publishing in the 1920s. It is currently the largest education company and was once the largest book publisher in the world. In 2013 Pearson merged its Penguin Books with German conglomerate Bertelsmann. In 2015, the company announced a change to focus solely on education. Pearson plc owns one of the GCSE examining boards for the UK, Edexcel. Pearson has a primary listing on the London Stock Exchange and is a constituent of the FTSE 100 Index. It has a secondary listing on the New York Stock Exchange in the form of American depositary receipts.

History

Construction business: 1844 to the 1920s
The company was founded by Samuel Pearson in 1844 as a building and engineering concern operating in Yorkshire under the name S. Pearson & Son.  In 1880, control passed to his grandson Weetman Dickinson Pearson (later 1st Viscount Cowdray), an engineer, who in 1890 moved the business to London and turned it into one of the world's largest construction companies. Another of its prominent engineers was Ernest William Moir who, after working for Pearson on tunnels in New York City, became the contractor's agent on construction of the Blackwall Tunnel under the River Thames in London between 1892 and 1897. The company also built the Admiralty Harbour at Dover, the Halifax Dry Dock in Canada, the East River Railway Tunnels in New York City, the Mexican Grand Canal that drained Mexico City, the Tehuantepec Railway in Mexico, and railways and harbours around the world. In November 1915, the firm began construction of HM Factory, Gretna, the largest cordite factory in the UK during World War I. In 1907 Weetman Pearson founded investment company Whitehall Securities Corporation Ltd which played an important role in the development of British airlines in the 1930s.

The construction business was shut down in the 1920s. Its final projects included construction of the Silent Valley Reservoir in Northern Ireland (contract awarded in 1923), and completion of the Sennar Dam, in Sudan, in 1925.

Publishing business: 1920s to 1990
In 1919, the firm acquired a 45% stake in the London branch of merchant bankers Lazard Brothers, an interest which was increased to 80% in 1932 during the depression years. Pearson continued to hold a 50% stake until 1999. In 1921, Pearson purchased a number of local daily and weekly newspapers in the United Kingdom, which it combined to form the Westminster Press group.

In 1957, it bought the Financial Times and acquired a 50% stake in The Economist. It purchased the publisher Longman in 1968.

The company was first listed on the London Stock Exchange in 1969. It bought the paperback publisher Penguin in 1970, and the children's imprint Ladybird Books in 1972. It bought a rival, the educational publisher Pitman Publishing, in 1985. In 1986, Pearson invested in the British Satellite Broadcasting consortium, which, a few years later merged with Sky Television to form a new company, British Sky Broadcasting (BSkyB).

1990 to 2000
During the 1990s, Pearson acquired a number of TV production and broadcasting assets (including former ITV franchisee Thames Television) and sold most of its non-media assets, under the leadership of future U.S. Congressman Bob Turner. Westminster Press was sold to Newsquest in 1996. Pearson acquired the education division of HarperCollins in 1996 from News Corporation and acquired book publishers Scott Foresman & Co. in 1996. In 1998 Pearson acquired Prentice Hall Textbooks/Simon & Schuster Trade Books from Viacom and merged it with its own education unit, Addison-Wesley Longman to form Pearson Education. Pearson sold several of the acquired divisions: first Appleton & Lange was divested to McGraw-Hill and Master Data Central was sold to Master Data Center. Then, Jossey-Bass was sold to John Wiley & Son and the Bureau of Business Practice was sold to Wolters Kluwer. Subsequently, Macmillan Library Reference's children's imprints (Silver Burdett Press, Dillon Press, Crestwood House, Silver Press, New Discovery and Julian Messner) were closed. Then, Gale acquired Macmillan Library Reference (Charles Scribner's Sons Reference, Macmillan Reference, Thorndike Press, G.K. Hall, Twayne Publishers and Schirmer Books). Finally, IDG Books acquired Macmillan General Reference (Frommer's, J.K. Lasser, Betty Crocker Cookbooks, Weight Watchers Dieting and Cookbooks and Howell House Pet Books).

Pearson took a $346 million loss on the sale.

2000 to 2010 
Pearson acquired Dorling Kindersley, the illustrated reference publisher and integrated it within Penguin, in March 2000 and then acquired National Computer Systems (NCS) in September 2000 so entering the educational assessment and school management systems market in the United States.

In 2002, Pearson sold its 22% stake in RTL Group for €1.5 billion, and then purchased Rough Guides, the travel publisher, and brought it under Penguin. Pearson acquired Edexcel, a provider of qualifications in the UK, in 2003 and acquired about 80% stake in Meximerica Media Inc for $16.5 million for the swelling U.S. Hispanic market in 2004.

Pearson purchased a series of other testing and assessment businesses, including Knowledge Technologies in 2004, AGS in 2005, and National Evaluation Systems and Promissor in 2006. Pearson acquired National Evaluation Systems, a provider of customised state assessments for teacher certification in the US, in April 2006 and announced that it had agreed to acquire Harcourt Assessment and Harcourt Education International from Reed Elsevier for $950m in cash in May 2007. Pearson then completed the acquisition of Harcourt Assessment, merging the acquired businesses into Pearson Assessment & Information. Pearson also acquired eCollege, a digital learning technology group for $477m in May 2007.

In February 2008, Pearson announced the sale of its Pearson Data Management Division (formerly the scanner manufacturing and servicing division of NCS Inc.) to Scantron Corporation (part of M&F Worldwide) which had been its main competitor.

Pearson acquired Wall Street English for $145m in 2009 and bought the school learning systems division of Sistema Educacional Brasileiro (SEB) for $497m in 2010. Also in 2010, Pearson sold its 61% stake in Interactive Data to investment funds managed by Silver Lake Partners and Warburg Pincus for $2 billion.

2010 to present
In July 2011, Pearson announced the creation of Pearson College, a British degree provider based in London. Also in 2011, Pearson acquired Connections Education and agreed to sell its 50% stake in FTSE International Limited to the London Stock Exchange for £450 million. In 2011, Pearson also increased its stake in TutorVista, such that it had a 76% stake, for $127 million.

Pearson entered into talks with rival conglomerate Bertelsmann, over the possibility of combining their respective publishing companies, Penguin Group and Random House in October 2012. The houses are considered two of the "Big Six" publishing companies. On 29 October 2012, Pearson said it would merge Penguin Books with Bertelsmann's Random House to create the world's biggest consumer book publisher. Then in May 2012 Pearson announced its acquisition of GlobalEnglish Corporation, an American Business English software and solutions company, in an all-cash transaction.

In May 2013, Pearson announced a new restructuring plan to invest in digital learning and emerging markets, after predicting weaker earnings.

The change supports the decoupling of the Penguin consumer publishing business into a separate entity with Random House (forming Penguin Random House). The new structure combines the separate education companies, Pearson International and Pearson North America under one Pearson company.  Pearson will organise around three global lines of business – School, Higher Education and Professional.  The Financial Times Group and Pearson English will form part of Pearson Professional.

In July 2014, the company announced it had cut 4,000 jobs, representing 10% of the company's workforce.

Pearson announced on 23 July 2015 that it had agreed to sell the FT Group, which includes business daily Financial Times, to Japanese media group Nikkei for £844 million, or $1.32 billion. The sale does not include FT Group's London property at One Southwark Bridge. Pearson also retained the publishing rights to FT Press and licensed the trademark from Nikkei. In August 2015, Pearson's sold its 50% stake in The Economist to the Agnelli family for £469 million who previously held 4.7% of the group. The remaining 50% of The Economist Group is owned by the Schroders, Cadburys and the Rothschilds.

On 5 November 2015, the company announced it was rebranding, including the creation of a new logo, with a "100% focus" on education.

On 3 July 2017, Pearson sold its Tutor Vista and Edurite lines of business to India-based education technology company, Byju's On 11 July 2017, Pearson agreed to reduce its holding in Penguin Random House to 25%, by selling a 22% stake in the business to Bertelsmann.

In August 2017 Pearson announced that it would cut 3,000 staff in an effort to save £300 million annually. On 16 August 2017 Pearson sold the language training subsidiary Global Education to Chinese company Pu-Xin Education for £62 million.

In November 2018 Pearson announced the launch of the Pearson Alumni Network.

In 2019, Pearson sold its US K-12 business to the private equity firm Nexus Capital Management. Pearson also sold its remaining 25% stake in Penguin Random House to Bertelsmann. Pearson CEO John Fallon retired from the company in 2020 and was succeeded by Andy Bird on 19 October 2020.

In December 2021, Pearson announced that Omid Kordestani had been appointed as the Board's chair. His position became effective in March 2022.

In April 2022, Pearson announced it had acquired the online language learning platform, Mondly.

Operations
Pearson has two main streams of business:
 Global lines of business: focuses on the school, higher education and professional areas (includes textbooks and digital technologies for teachers and students). Pearson's school brands include BTEC, Bug Club, Edexcel, Fronter, GradPoint, Schoolnet, and SuccessNet. Pearson's higher education brands include eCollege, Mastering/MyLabs, Revel, online tutoring (Smarthinking), and Financial Times Publishing.
 Geographic streams: focuses on North American market, growth markets and core markets.

Pearson in Practice
Pearson in Practice Technology, formerly Zenos IT Academy, was only part of Pearson in Practice and was an institute offering government-funded apprenticeships for learners aged 16 to 24, and paid learning for people outside those boundaries. It focuses on giving its candidates the ability to sit Microsoft exams after an intense learning program that lasts for 12 months. Learners explored the full boundaries of computing, by looking at advanced server technology, internet knowledge, group policies and various other sections related to networks and computers. According to an Ofsted report in 2012, the graduation rate for the Zenos organization was higher than the average college percentages, and lay at 90%.

Pearson announced plans to exit Pearson in Practice on 7 January 2013, although learners already signed up will be supported until the end of their courses. In February 2013 it was transferred to Vision Workforce Skills.

Pearson VUE
Pearson VUE is an electronic testing company, owned by Pearson PLC. Founded in 1994 by E. Clarke Porter as Virtual University Enterprises, the company now operates in 165 countries with more than 5,000 authorized test centers.

Pearson VUE co-sponsored the 10th Annual International Conference on Medical Regulation, which took place at the Ottawa Convention Centre in Ontario, Canada in October 2012.

Criticism
Concerns exist around the amount of influence Pearson, being a commercial company, has on public education.  Other concerns are around tax avoidance, high value contracts, and in one instance, laying off teachers to offset the high costs of testing. In 2017, more than six out of ten Pearson's shareholders voted against the chief executive's pay package of £1.5m after the company made a record loss. Pearson US has been criticised for using offshore tax avoidance schemes involving a host of companies at a service address in Luxembourg.

In the United Kingdom, Pearson owns Edexcel, an education and examination board. Edexcel has produced qualifications which link to Pearson texts, although Edexcel also continues to endorse textbooks published by other companies. Edexcel has also faced criticism over repeated leaks of exam material in consecutive years; police investigations into some of the incidents were referred to prosecutors.

In June 2010, Pearson plc received notification that the Libyan Investment Authority (LIA) founded by Muammar Gaddafi's son Saif al-Islam Gaddafi as a sovereign fund, had acquired 24,431,000 shares within the company via Euroclear. On further investigation, Pearson said the LIA may have acquired an additional 2,141,179 shares, resulting in a total interest of 26,572,179 shares. At the time, this represented a major holding of 3.27% within the company and the investment was worth around £280 million.

See also

 Bertelsmann 
 Elsevier
 Holtzbrinck Publishing Group
 Lagardère Publishing
 McGraw Hill Education
 News Corp
 Scholastic Corporation
 Thomson Reuters
 Wiley (publisher)

References

External links

 
 
 List of Pearson-owned companies from the Columbia Journalism Review
 

1844 establishments in England
 
British brands
British companies established in 1844
Companies listed on the London Stock Exchange
Companies listed on the New York Stock Exchange
Construction and civil engineering companies established in 1844
Education companies established in 1844
Mass media companies established in 1844
Mass media companies of the United Kingdom
Multinational companies headquartered in England
Multinational publishing companies
Pan-European media companies
Publishing companies established in 1844